Mirihana Arachchige Nanda Malini Perera (Sinhala:නන්දා මාලනී: born 23 August 1943), popularly as Nanda Malini, is a Sri Lankan musician. One of the best known and most honoured singers of Sri Lanka, Malini's choice of singing themes are based on real life and social-cultural situations. Her songs intricate notional ideas of relationships, life-circumstances, and emotions that stem out of human realities.

Early life 
Nanda was born on 23 August 1943 as the fourth child to a rural family of nine in Lewwanduwa in Aluthgama, Sri Lanka. Her father, Vincent Perera was a skillful tailor and ready-made coat maker. Her mother, Liyanage Emily Perera was a housewife. She has four sisters and four brothers. She moved to Kotahena in Colombo as an adolescent and was admitted to Sri Gunananda Vidyalaya where she came under the tutelage of T. N. Margaret Perera. 

She was married to Suneth Gokula and the couple has two daughters – Varuni Saroja, Ama Sarada. Elder daughter Varuni is married to Chaminda, son of popular lyricist Dharmasiri Gamage. Younger daughter Ama is married to Sanjeewa.

Career
In 1956, she contested for ‘Padya Gayana’ competition held at Borella YMBA, in which she won a gold medal. After winning the poetry contest, Radio Ceylon W. D. Amaradeva invited Nanda to take part in a song, she sang the song Budu Sadu written by Asoka Colombage and set to music by D. D. Danny on Karunaratne Abeysekera's popular program known as Lama Mandapaya on Radio. In 1963, Amaradeva selected Malini for background singing for the film Ranmuthu Duwa, the first Sinhala colour film. In that film, she sang the song Galana Gagaki Jeewithe with Narada Disasekara which was the first song written by Chandraratne Manawasinghe for cinema. The film won all the Sarasavi awards for music that year where Malini won the award for the Best Female Singer, her first major award. Since then she has sung in many films and has won 11 Sarasavi awards, 8 Presidential awards and adjudged the most popular female vocalist from 1995-98.

Nanda continued her training after achieving fame, learning under B. Victor Perera. She studied for a year at Heywood Institute of Art and moving on to Bhatkhande Music Institute in Lucknow, India in 1963. She would later return to the University to obtain a Visharada degree in 1984 with a First Division Distinction.

Upon her return to Sri Lanka, Malini appeared on W.D. Amaradeva's program "Madhuvanthi" singing the songs Sannaliyane and Ran Dahadiya Bindu Bindu. Malini has had a string of successful releases. Her lyrics depict realistic life situations, love, relationships, and emotions. The songs Pipunu Male Ruwa, Sudu Hamine, and Kada Mandiye attest to her effort to expose the hearts of women. Some of Nanda's popular songs, such as Manda Nawa Karanawa, show a humorous and sensitive account of a young woman's experience of loneliness.

In 1971, Nanda collaborated with Amaradewa in the "Srawana Aradhana concert". In 1973, she started her first solo concert series, and after having 530 shows the series ended on 22 May 1979. In August 1981 she started another concert series "Sathyaye Geethaya". She played 500 shows and ended in August 1984. She conducted her next solo musical concert series "Pavana" in June 1987 which ran for 18 months with 205 shows. Her songs in "Pavana" were banned in SLBC and SLRC where the concert was also banned. After 22 years her newest solo musical concert titled "Shwetha Rathriya" was held with the collaboration of Sirasa FM in 2010.

In 1984, she established a music academy Nanda Malini Ashram. 

Malini has produced 25 cassettes such as Malata Renu, Saadu Naada and Sari Podiththak. On 8 September 2007, she launched her CD Etha Kandu Yaye comprising a collection of 16 award winning songs. The launching ceremony was held at the BMICH Open Air Theater at 7.30 p.m. In 1993,  she composed a CD "Kunkuma Pottu" which has songs sung in Tamil. Another of her CD's titled "Andaharaya" is made up of music composed of computer software.

In 2017, she has conferred the honorary degree ‘Darshana Shuri’, Doctor of Philosophy of Fine Arts by the University of Visual and Performing Arts. It was the first time that a female artiste was recognized by a university in Sri Lanka.

Legacy
In 2004, a hybrid orchid was named as "Nanda Malini Ascosanda" in honor of Nanda Malini.

Albums

01. Saadu Naada 

 Budu Saadu
 Buddhanubhawena
 Budu Karunaa
 Aku Daa
 Danno Budunge
 Lokananda Thilona
 Dura Penena Thanithala
 Seela Samadhi
 Muni Nandana Siripaada

02. Sari Podiththak 

 Ruk Aththana Mala Mudune
 Surangeeta Duka Hithuna
 Wasanawa Aege Nrthai
 Miriwadi Sangalak
 Sari Podiththak
 Sakura Mal Pipila
 Sudu Haamine 
 Ran Giri Giri Gigiri 
 Chandra Mandulu Yata 
 Mal Kiyanne Kaata Kaata 
 Mihimandale Anduru Kuse
 Deega Nogiya Punchi Nanda
 Mage Sina Oba Araganna
 Mal Mal Heenaya 
 Wessa Walaahaka
 Buddhaanubhaawena

02. Sansara Sagare 

 Peedena Goyame    ( Lyrics By – Sunil Ariyaratne Music By – Stanley Peries)
 Sanda Mala    (  Lyrics By – Kularatne Ariyawansa Music By – Rohana Weerasinghe)
 Sansara Sagare    ( Lyrics By – Sunil Ariyaratne Music By – Sarath Dassanayake)
 Ma Pidu    ( Lyrics By – Kularatne Ariyawansa Music By – Stanley Peries)
 Kothanada Oba    ( Lyrics By – Sunil Ariyaratne Music By – Stanley Peries)
 Wata Kotu    ( Lyrics By – Tilak Kuruwita Bandara Music By – Rohana Weerasinghe)
 Nil Latha Pura    ( Lyrics By – Kularatne Ariyawansa Music By – Sarath Dassanayake)
 Punchi Punchi    ( Lyrics By – Kularatne Ariyawansa Music By – Stanley Peries)
 Lowe Sonduru    ( Lyrics By – Kularatne Ariyawansa Music By – Rohana Weerasinghe)
 Wasanawan    ( Lyrics By – Kularatne Ariyawansa Music By – Rohana Weerasinghe)
 Dura Atha    ( Lyrics By – Camilus Perera Music By – Sarath Dassanayake)
 Yowun Wasanthe    ( Lyrics By – Sunil Ariyaratne Music By – Sarath Dasanayake)

Discography

 Perada Maha Ra
 Pahan Kanda
 Sathyaye Geethaya
 Hemanthayedi
 Tharuka Es, Pavana
 Sindu Hodiya
 Kinduriyakage Vilapaya
 Madhu Bandun
 Tharu
 Malmada Bisau
 Cinema Geethavalokana
 Kirimadu Vel
 Londonyedi Geyu Gee
 Yathra, Handahami
 Sanka Padma
 Pembara Lanka
 Kunkuma Pottu
 Gramaphone Gee
 Araliya Landata
 Malata Renu
 Nilambare
 Sari Podittak
 Pirith Pen

References

External links
 Nanda Malini's Songs
 Music And Mission – Bob Dylan To Nanda Malani
 Milestones in the evolution of Sinhala film music
 Listen to Nanda's High quality Songs here On request
 පළමුව සම්මානය ලැබූ දිනත් අද සිටින තැනත් සිහිපත් වුණා
 මල් කියන්නේ කාට කාට ළමයින්ටයි පාට පාට
 Nanda Malani All Songs Mp3
 Nanda Malini, Deepika to perform Down Under
 තාත්තා කිව්වා උඹට පිස්සුද

1943 births
Sri Lankan Buddhists
20th-century Sri Lankan women singers
Living people
Sri Lankan composers
Sinhalese singers